Statistics of Emperor's Cup in the 1962 season.

Overview
It was contested by 16 teams, and Chuo University won the championship.

Results

1st Round
Shida Soccer 2–3 Osaka Soccer
Hokuyo Mokuzai Club 0–7 Chuo University
Waseda University 5–1 Kyoto Shiko
Toyo Industries 2–0 All Mitsubishi
Kwansei Gakuin University 10–0 Toyama Soccer
Furukawa Electric 5–0 Tohoku Gakuin University
Yawata Steel 2–1 Kansai University
Meiji University 5–1 Teijin Matsuyama

Quarterfinals
Osaka Soccer 0–2 Chuo University
Waseda University 0–1 Toyo Industries
Kwansei Gakuin University 0–1 Furukawa Electric
Yawata Steel 4–2 Meiji University

Semifinals
Chuo University 1–0 Toyo Industries
Furukawa Electric 3–2 Yawata Steel

Final
  
Chuo University 2–1 Furukawa Electric
Chuo University won the championship.

References
 NHK

Emperor's Cup
1962 in Japanese football